Cecilia Jonsson (born 30 November 1990) is a Swedish sailor. She qualified to represent Sweden in the 2020 Tokyo Summer Olympics alongside Emil Järudd, competing at the Mixed Multihull - Nacra 17 Foiling event, where she ranked 14th.

References

External links 
 
 
 

1990 births
Living people
Swedish female sailors (sport)
Olympic sailors of Sweden
Sailors at the 2020 Summer Olympics – Nacra 17
20th-century Swedish women
21st-century Swedish women